Yinmabin is a town and seat of the Yinmabin Township in the Sagaing Division in central Myanmar some  west of Mandalay.

References 

Township capitals of Myanmar
Populated places in Sagaing Region